Rails Day is a competition which gives teams of developers 24 hours to build the best web app that they can using Ruby on Rails.

The first competition was held on June 4, 2005.

2005 Winners
Out of 55 Entries that qualified:

 Sheets by Robert John Bousquet and Cyrus Farajpour
 YubNub by Jon Aquino
 Fichebowl by Brandt Kurowski, Ben Tucker, and Aaron Michal

2006 Winners
Out of 183 Entries (only 127 actually committed anything to SVN):

Best Overall

 Freckle (#65) by Amy Hoy and Elise Wood.
 Good to Garden (#40) by Will Emigh and Rory Starks.
 Cuppin (#33) by Peat Bakke and Raymond Brigleb.

Best Solo Project

 Rails Wishlist (#174) by Hampton Catlin.

Best User Interface

 WeRateStuff (#18) by Fred Oliveira, Tiago Macedo and Pedro Freitas.
 D20 Online (#47) by Tom Leiber, Jeff Mickey and Javier.
 C.umul.us (#59) by Jae Hess.

Most Creative

 Awesome Ninja Game (#182) by Tobias Lutke, Cody, and Daniel.
 Family Book (#19) by Lucas Carlson and John Butler
 Roomind.us (#119) by Dominic Damian, Ben Myles and Chris Abad.

Most Useful

 Heartbeat (#103) by Charles Brian Quinn and Derek Haynes.
 Regex Tutor (#61) by Ryan Bates.
 Profilr (#84) by Terence Haddock and Mark Chadwick.

Related competitions 
Rails Rumble

Ruby (programming language)